The Haryana legislative assembly election, 2000 was held on 22 February 2000, to select the 90 members of the Haryana Legislative Assembly. Results were declared on 25 February 2000. Indian National Lok Dal got 47 seats and form government.

Results
The results were declared on 25 February 2000.

Elected members

Cabinet 
 Om Prakash Chautala ministry

References

2000
2000
Haryana